Poshteh-ye Pirdad (also Romanized as Poshteh-ye Pīrdād) is a village in Hudian Rural District, in the Central District of Dalgan County, Sistan and Baluchestan Province, Iran. At the 2006 census, its population was 130, in 25 families.

References 

Populated places in Dalgan County